Stink bug or stinkbug is a common name for several insects and may refer to:

 Any of several bugs in the true bug (hemipteran) family Pentatomidae
Halyomorpha halys, or brown marmorated stink bug
Chinavia hilaris, or green stink bug
 Boisea trivittata, or boxelder bug
 Scutelleridae, or jewel stinkbugs
 Eleodes, or stink beetles, a genus in the darkling beetle family